Talang-e Anbari (also Romanized as Talang-e Ānbārī; also known as Talang and Tālang) is a village in Karian Rural District, in the Central District of Minab County, Hormozgan Province, Iran. At the 2006 census, its population was 259, in 52 families.

References 

Populated places in Minab County